William Henry Perrins (13 July 1793 – 6 January 1867) was an English drug-store chemist who formed a business partnership with John Wheeley Lea in 1823. They went on to create the Lea & Perrins brand of Worcestershire sauce. He lived in Lansdowne Crescent in the parish of Claines, and is buried in St John, Baptist Churchyard, Claines.

References

1793 births
1867 deaths
19th-century English businesspeople
People from Wyre Forest District